Moreh College, Chandel, established in 1992, is a general degree college in Moreh, Tengnoupal district, Manipur. It offers undergraduate courses in science and arts. It is affiliated to  Manipur University.

Accreditation
The college is recognized by the University Grants Commission (UGC).

See also
Education in India
Manipur University
Literacy in India
List of institutions of higher education in Manipur

References

External links

Colleges affiliated to Manipur University
Educational institutions established in 1992
Universities and colleges in Manipur
1992 establishments in Manipur